Aristóbulo Istúriz Almeida (20 December 1946 – 27 April 2021) was a Venezuelan politician and academic who was vice president of the Constituent Assembly of Venezuela in August 2017; he was also the vice president of Venezuela from January 2016 to January 2017.

Life and career
He was a professor at the Centro de Estudios del Desarrollo (CENDES) of the Universidad Central de Venezuela. He was elected to Parliament several times for Acción Democrática, representing the Federal District (now the Capital District), before joining the Radical Cause in 1986. He was elected as Mayor of the Libertador Municipality of Caracas on 6 December 1992, serving in that post until 2 January 1996. After finishing his term as mayor (having lost his re-election bid to Antonio Ledezma), he became co-presenter of the Globovisión television show Blanco y Negro.

In 1997, together with some other ex-Radical Cause members, he co-founded Homeland for All (Patria Para Todos, PPT), which in the 1998 presidential election decided to support Hugo Chávez. Between 2001 and 2007 he served as Minister of Education in Chávez's government. In 2008 Istúriz was the pro-Chávez Patriotic Alliance's candidate for Mayor of Caracas; he was narrowly defeated.

He was leader of the Venezuelan teachers' association SUMA for a time.

In the 2012 regional elections, he was elected Governor of Anzoátegui.

On 6 January 2016, President Nicolas Maduro appointed Istúriz as Vice President of Venezuela. He remained in office for one year, until Tareck El Aissami was appointed to succeed him on 4 January 2017.

In October 2017, Istúriz ran again for governor of Anzoátegui. He lost to MUD/AD candidate Antonio Barreto Sira.

Death 
Istúriz died on 27 April 2021, following complications from an open-heart surgery.

Controversy

Sanctions 
Canada sanctioned 40 Venezuelan officials, including Istúriz, in September 2017. The sanctions were for behaviors that undermined democracy after at least 125 people were killed in the 2017 Venezuelan protests and "in response to the government of Venezuela's deepening descent into dictatorship"; Chrystia Freeland, Foreign Minister said, "Canada will not stand by silently as the government of Venezuela robs its people of their fundamental democratic rights." 

The Canadian regulations of the Special Economic Measures Act prohibited any "person in Canada and any Canadian outside Canada from: dealing in property, wherever situated, that is owned, held or controlled by listed persons or a person acting on behalf of a listed person; entering into or facilitating any transaction related to a dealing prohibited by these Regulations; providing any financial or related services in respect of a dealing prohibited by these Regulations; making available any goods, wherever situated, to a listed person or a person acting on behalf of a listed person; and providing any financial or other related services to or for the benefit of a listed person."

References

External links
  Official website

|-

|-

|-

|-

|-

1946 births
2021 deaths
Academic staff of the Central University of Venezuela
Democratic Action (Venezuela) politicians
Fatherland for All politicians
Government ministers of Venezuela
Governors of Anzoátegui
Mayors of places in Venezuela
People from Miranda (state)
People of the Crisis in Venezuela
Radical Cause politicians
United Socialist Party of Venezuela politicians
Venezuelan city councillors
Venezuelan schoolteachers
Vice presidents of Venezuela
Death in Caracas
Members of the Venezuelan Constituent Assembly of 1999
Members of the Venezuelan Constituent Assembly of 2017
Education ministers of Venezuela